Victor Crouin (born 16 June 1999 in Marseille) is a French professional squash player. As of September 2022, he was ranked number 10 in the world after winning the Open de France de Squash 2022.

Crouin is enrolled in the Harvard University class of 2022 and plays for Harvard's varsity squash team.

References

External links 

1999 births
Living people
French male squash players
Harvard Crimson men's squash players
20th-century French people
21st-century French people